Rezza Rezky Ramadhani bin Yacobjan (born 8 November 2000) is a Singaporean professional footballer who plays for Singapore Premier League club Young Lions.

He was 1st nominated for the 2017 Dollah Salleh cup but failed to win it.

In 2018, he was nominated again for the award  but this time round lost to Nur Adam.

International career
Rezza was invited for the national team training on 3 and 10 March 2020. This was his first involvement with the senior side.

Career statistics

Club

Personal life
Rezza Rezky's brother, Haiqal Pashia, also played in the Singapore Premier League.  Both were called up for the 2019 Merlion Cup.

Honours

International
Singapore U22
 Merlion Cup: 2019

References

Living people
1998 births
Singaporean footballers
Singapore international footballers
Association football midfielders
Singapore Premier League players
Young Lions FC players
Competitors at the 2017 Southeast Asian Games
People from Singapore
Southeast Asian Games competitors for Singapore